Strait Island is an island of the Andaman Islands. It belongs to the North and Middle Andaman administrative district, part of the Indian union territory of Andaman and Nicobar Islands.

History
Strait Island is a tribal reservation.
The reservation for the Great Andamanese, one of the indigenous people of the Andaman Islands, was built and is managed by the Andaman administration.
The Andamanese settlement was constructed like a model village in India. The Great Andamanese settlement was constructed with concrete houses in rows. The other half is occupied by welfare personnel and police quarters. There is a school for children and a small dispensary for primary health care.
There is a lighthouse at the top of the tallest hill on the island, established 1983.

Geography
The island belongs to the East Baratang Group and lies east of Colebrooke Island.
The island is comma-shaped, and heavily forested.

Fauna
Strait Island is known for its caves of birds' nests and plentiful deer (though they are now rare).

Economy
The villagers' occupations are growing coconut palms, tamarind, and mango trees.

Administration
Politically, Strait Island, along neighboring East Baratang Group, is part of Rangat Taluk.

Demographics 
There is only 1 village, located at the island. 
The population at the 2011 census was 39 (of which 26 were male), living in 15 households.

Transportation
From the Port Blair harbour, there is a bi-weekly ferry service which is the only mode of conveyance available.

Image gallery

References 

Cities and towns in North and Middle Andaman district
Islands of North and Middle Andaman district
Tourist attractions in the Andaman and Nicobar Islands
Islands of the Bay of Bengal
Populated places in India
Islands of India